The 2003 Melanesian Championships in Athletics took place between April 25–27, 2003. The event was held in Lae, Papua New Guinea in conjunction with the Papua New Guinea National Athletics Championships.

A total of 31 events were contested, 18 by men and 13 by women.

Medal summary
Medal winners and their results were published on the Athletics Weekly webpage.  Full results can be found on the Athletics Papua New Guinea webpage.

Men

Women

Medal table (unofficial)

References

Melanesian Championships in Athletics
Athletics in Papua New Guinea
International sports competitions hosted by Papua New Guinea
Melanesian Championships
2003 in Papua New Guinean sport
April 2003 sports events in Oceania